Hsu Chih-chieh is a Taiwanese politician. He is member of the Democratic Progressive Party and a two-term legislator in the Legislative Yuan.

Early life
Hsu obtained his bachelor's degree in mechanical engineering from National Taiwan University and master's degree from National Kaohsiung Normal University.

See also

 List of members of the eighth Legislative Yuan

References

External links

 Facebook - 許智傑

1966 births
Living people
Democratic Progressive Party Members of the Legislative Yuan
Members of the 8th Legislative Yuan
National Taiwan University alumni
Members of the 9th Legislative Yuan
Members of the 10th Legislative Yuan